The following is a list of squads for all sixteen national teams that competed at the Copa América Centenario. Each national team had to submit a squad of 23 players, three of whom had to be goalkeepers.
The provisional squads were announced on 4 May 2016. A final selection was provided to the organizers on 20 May 2016.

Group A

Colombia
Head coach:  José Pékerman

The following 23 players were called up for the final squad. Óscar Murillo withdrew due to injury and was replaced by Yerry Mina.

Costa Rica
Head coach: Óscar Ramírez

The following 23 players were called up for the final squad. Goalkeeper Esteban Alvarado was ruled out due to injury on 20 May, being replaced by Leonel Moreira. On 31 May, Keylor Navas pulled out due to a tendinitis on his left foot and was replaced by Danny Carvajal, and Ariel Rodríguez pulled out due to injury and was replaced by Johnny Woodly.

Paraguay
Head coach:  Ramón Díaz

The following players were named for the final squad. Forward Roque Santa Cruz was in the initial squad but withdrew injured and was replaced by Antonio Sanabria. Pablo Aguilar and Néstor Ortigoza also pulled out due to injury and were replaced by Víctor Ayala and Iván Piris respectively.

United States
Head coach:  Jürgen Klinsmann

The final squad was announced on 21 May. Timothy Chandler was ruled out due to injury and replaced by Edgar Castillo on 27 May.

Group B

Brazil
Head coach: Dunga

The following players were named to the final squad. Neymar couldn’t participate due to an agreement between FC Barcelona and CBF, and was replaced by Lucas Lima. Ricardo Oliveira and Douglas Costa were ruled out due to injury and replaced by Jonas and Kaká on 20 and 26 May respectively. Gabriel Jesus, who would later be part of the 2016 Brazil Olympic squad, was considered as a replacement for Douglas Costa but missed selection through the lack of a U.S. visa. Rafinha and Ederson also pulled out on 31 May and were replaced by Lucas Moura and Marcelo Grohe. In turn, Kaká pulled out due to injury on 1 June and was replaced by Ganso. Luiz Gustavo withdrew from the squad on 2 June due to personal reasons and was replaced by Walace.

Ecuador
Head coach:  Gustavo Quinteros

The following 23 players were called up for the final squad.

Haiti
Head coach:  Patrice Neveu

The following 23 players were called up for the final squad.

Peru
Head coach:  Ricardo Gareca

The following 23 players were called up for the final squad.

Group C

Jamaica
Head coach:  Winfried Schäfer

The following 23 players were selected for the final squad. Simon Dawkins was ruled out due to injury and replaced by Joel Grant on 2 June.

Mexico
Head coach:  Juan Carlos Osorio

The following 23 players were called up for the final squad. Jürgen Damm withdrew due to injury and was replaced by Cándido Ramírez.

Uruguay
Head coach: Óscar Tabárez

The following 23 players were selected for the final squad. On 30 May, Cristian Rodríguez pulled out due to injury and was replaced by Diego Laxalt.

Venezuela
Head coach: Rafael Dudamel

The following 23 players were selected for the final squad.

Group D

Argentina
Head coach: Gerardo Martino

The following 23 players were selected for the final squad.

Bolivia
Head coach: Julio César Baldivieso

The following 23 players were called up for the final squad. Samuel Galindo withdrew due to injury and was replaced by Carmelo Algarañaz.
Nelson Cabrera was subsequently found to be ineligible by FIFA after the tournament.

Chile
Head coach:  Juan Antonio Pizzi

The following 23 players were called up for the final squad. On 1 June, Matías Fernández pulled out due to injury and was replaced by Mark González.

Panama
Head coach:  Hernán Darío Gómez

The following 23 players were called up for the final squad.

Player representation

By age

Players
Oldest:  Justo Villar
Youngest:  Christian Pulisic

Goalkeepers
Oldest:  Justo Villar
Youngest:  Wuilker Faríñez

Captains
Oldest:  Justo Villar
Youngest:  James Rodríguez

By club
Clubs are ordered alphabetically: first by country, then by club name.

By club nationality
Nations in bold are represented by their national teams in the tournament

References

2016
squads